The 2000 Women's Five Nations Championship was the second Women's Five Nations Championship and was won by England, who achieved the Grand Slam. Spain took part for the first time, replacing Ireland.

Final table

Results

See also
Women's Six Nations Championship
Women's international rugby union

References

External links
The official RBS Six Nations Site

2000
1999–2000 in English rugby union
1999–2000 in Welsh rugby union
1999–2000 in Scottish rugby union
1999–2000 in French rugby union
1999–2000 in Spanish rugby union
1999–2000 in European women's rugby union
rugby union
rugby union
rugby union
International women's rugby union competitions hosted by Spain
2000 in Scottish women's sport
2000 in Welsh women's sport
Women's Five Nations
Women's Five Nations
Women's Five Nations